Haseenabanu Ismail (born 9 November 1969) is a South African politician of the Democratic Alliance who is serving as a member of the South African National Assembly since May 2019. Ismail was previously the councillor for ward 29 in the Ekurhuleni Metropolitan Municipality.

Political career
She is a member of the Democratic Alliance. In 2013, she was appointed to the Ekurhuleni city council as a proportional representation (PR) councillor. Prior to the 2016 municipal elections, Ismail was chosen as the DA's candidate for ward 29 in Ekurhuleni, an area that includes Actonville. She won the election with 43.9% of the vote.

Before the 2019 general election, Ismail was ranked 13th on the DA's national list. At the election, she won a seat in the National Assembly. She is a member of the Portfolio Committee on Health in parliament.

References

External links
Ms Haseenabanu Ismail at Parliament of South Africa

Living people
1969 births
Democratic Alliance (South Africa) politicians
Members of the National Assembly of South Africa
Women members of the National Assembly of South Africa
21st-century South African politicians
People from Benoni
South African Muslims